Barbara Grażyna Zdrojewska (born 30 May 1960) is a Polish politician. She was elected to the Senate of Poland (10th term) representing the constituency of Wrocław.

References 

Living people
1960 births
20th-century Polish politicians
21st-century Polish politicians
20th-century Polish women politicians
21st-century Polish women politicians
Members of the Senate of Poland 2019–2023
Women members of the Senate of Poland